Oswald O'Brien (6 April 1928 – 10 March 1997) was a British and European Labour Co-operative politician. He was one of the shortest serving Members of Parliament of modern times, serving just seven weeks and one day.

Early life
He was born Oswald O'Brien into the Darlington family of a disabled First World War soldier and mill worker mother in 1928. From St Mary's Catholic Grammar School he went to Fircroft College, Birmingham and St Cuthbert's Society in the University of Durham, during which he served as President of the Durham Union, after World War II service in the Royal Navy which he volunteered for lying about his age by one year (aged 14) to relieve economic pressure on his family.

Political career
O'Brien was committed to the causes of nuclear disarmament, equality and liberation politics. He was a teacher at Durham University, Director of Studies of the Co-operative College, Workplace Director of Alcohol Concern, member of Commission of Industrial Relations, Workers' Educational Association, and European and International Consultant on workers rights, economics and security.

Following the death of Edward Fletcher, the sitting member, O'Brien was elected as Member of Parliament for Darlington in the March 1983 by-election, holding the marginal Labour seat with a majority of 2,412. In the general election held less than two months later, he lost the seat by a margin of 3,438 votes to the Conservative candidate Michael Fallon, who had been his rival in the by-election. He never returned to Parliament.

See also
 List of United Kingdom MPs with the shortest service

References
Times Guide to the House of Commons 1983

External links 
Obituary - The Independent
 

1928 births
1997 deaths
Labour Co-operative MPs for English constituencies
UK MPs 1979–1983
Alumni of St Cuthbert's Society, Durham
Royal Navy sailors
Presidents of the Durham Union